David Rangel Pastor (born 25 July 1979) is a Spanish former professional footballer who played as a goalkeeper.

Football career
Born in Valencia, Rangel graduated from local Valencia CF's youth system, going on to spend several years with the B-team and also being loaned to neighbouring club Burjassot CF. In the 2003–04 season he backed up Santiago Cañizares and Andrés Palop in the main squad, making his first and only La Liga appearance on 14 May 2004 – as the Che were already champions – in a 1–2 away loss against Villarreal CF.

In 2004, Rangel signed with UE Lleida in the second division, with the Catalonia side being relegated in his second season, where he played in 27 of the 42 league matches. Subsequently, he resumed his career in the third level, playing mainly in his native region.

Honours
Valencia
La Liga: 2003–04
UEFA Cup: 2003–04

References

External links

CiberChe stats and bio 

1979 births
Living people
Footballers from Valencia (city)
Spanish footballers
Association football goalkeepers
La Liga players
Segunda División players
Segunda División B players
Tercera División players
Valencia CF Mestalla footballers
Valencia CF players
UE Lleida players
Hércules CF players
UD Alzira footballers
Ontinyent CF players
CD Castellón footballers
Deportivo Alavés players
CD Alcoyano footballers
CD Olímpic de Xàtiva footballers